Miroslav Cikán (11 February 1896 – 1 February 1962 in Prague) was a Czechoslovak film director. He frequently worked with actors such as Hugo Haas, Jan Werich, and Vlasta Burian.

Filmography

The Mystery of the Blue Room (1933)
Dum na predmesti (1933)
Hrdinný kapitán Korkorán (1934)
U nás v Kocourkove (1934)
Na Svatém Kopecku (1934)
Man in Demand on All Sides (1934)
Na rùzích ustláno (1935)
Barbora rádí (1935)
Král ulice (1935)
Lojzicka (1936)
The Comedian's Princess (1936)
Poslícek lásky (1937)
Devce za výkladem (1937)
Vzdusné torpédo 48 (1937)
Battalion (1937)
Andula Won (1937)
Not a Word About Love (1937)
Její pastorkyne (1938)
Vandiny trampoty (1938)
Svet kde se zebrá (1938)
Forbidden Love (1938)
Kdybych byl tátou (1939)
Dobre situovaný pán (1939)
V pokusení (1939)
Studujeme za školou (1939)
Príklady táhnou (1939)
Eighteen Years Old (1939)
Finally Alone (1940)
Happiness for Two (1940)
Pelikán má alibi (1940)
For a Friend (1940)
Provdám svou zenu (1941)
From the Czech Mills (1941)
Karel and I (1942)
U peti veverek (1944)
Veselá bída (1944)
Das schwarze Schaf (1944) (as Friedrich Zittau)
Glück unterwegs (1944) (as Friedrich Zittau)
Paklíc (1944)
The Avalanche (1946)
Hrdinové mlcí (1946)
Alena (1947)
Matous the Cobbler (1948)
Prípad Z-8 (1949)
Steam Above a Pot (1950)
The Struggle Will End Tomorrow (1951)
A Warning (1953)
Na konci mesta (1955)
Muž v povětří (1956)
Jurásek (1957)
Konec cesty (1960)

References

External links

1896 births
1962 deaths
Film directors from Prague
People from the Kingdom of Bohemia
Czechoslovak film directors